George Loch (1811 – 18 August 1887) was a Scottish Liberal Party politician. He was elected as the member of parliament (MP) for Wick at the 1868 general election, but resigned his seat on 6 February 1872 by becoming Steward of the Manor of Northstead.

References

External links 

1811 births
1887 deaths
UK MPs 1868–1874
Members of the Parliament of the United Kingdom for Highland constituencies
Scottish Liberal Party MPs